The annual festival of trichambaram temple  (Trichambaram Utsavam) is a colourful event.

Govindha!, Govindha!
The fortnight-long festival begins on Kumbham 22 of Malayalam calendar (which generally falls on 6 March) every year with the kodiyettam (hoisting of a religious flag) and comes to an end on Meenam 6 (which generallay falls on 20 March) with Koodipiriyal (Ending of this festival). In between these dates, for 11 days, thitambu nriththam (a sort of dance with the deities of Krishna and Balarama) is held at Pookoth Nada (1 km from Trichambaram temple). On the last day, the devotees run from Trichambram temple to Mazhur temple shouting Govinda!, Govinda!.

Krishna Temple
A sacred place of the Vaishnava sect that predates the 10th century, the deity of the temple is Sree Krishna. The sculptures on the walls of the sanctum sanctorum are unique by themselves. The annual temple festival, usually held in March, is a colourful event.

Govindha, Govindha!
The procession on the final day of the festival starts from Taliparamba and proceeds to Mazhur village through the Chinmaya Mission Road.  The devotees shout Govinda, Govinda all the way and they carry lighted cloth torches in the procession.  This procession is essentially a fast paced one and all the participants have to run during the ceremony.  Even the policemen on duty inside the procession have no other option as the rituals insist a running ceremony.

External links
 Trichambaram Uthsavam at Facebook

Hindu festivals in Kerala
Taliparamba
February observances
March observances
Festivals in Kannur district